Harry Rickards (4 December 1843 – 13 October 1911), born Henry Benjamin Leete, was an English-born baritone, comedian and theatre owner, most active in vaudeville and stage, first in his native England and then Australia after emigrating in 1871.

Early life
Rickards was born in Stratford, London, England, the son of Benjamin Halls Leete, a printer and later chief engineer of the Egyptian railways and his wife Mary (née Watkins) Harry was also intended to be an engineer. He had been forbidden during his apprenticeship to attend theatres by his Puritan parents. He married Caroline Hayden on 10 March 1862 at Bromley.

Theatrical career
Rickards, however, developed a talent for comic singing — he was engaged as a vocalist at music halls in Canterbury and Oxford, where he appeared under the name of "Harry Rickards". He established a reputation as a singer of comic songs,  even  performing for the Prince of Wales and then travelled to Australia, reaching Melbourne on 28 November 1871. He made his first appearance there at the St George's hall, Melbourne, on 9 December 1871. He then went to Sydney where he also appeared with success. Finding himself in debt in 1874, he toured the United States, returning  to London the following year, and also toured a company in South Africa in 1876. Returning to England he was a successful "lion comique" at the music halls and a good pantomime comedian, particularly in the provinces. He again visited Australia in 1885, and for some years toured Australia with a vaudeville company, of which he was the "star", with much success. About 1893 he bought the Garrick theatre, Sydney and renamed it the Tivoli; he built up the Tivoli circuit, taking control of the Opera House, Melbourne, and was also lessee of theatres in other state capital cities. Every year he visited England, and during the next 18 years he engaged for the Australian variety stage great artists like Harry Houdini, Marie Lloyd, Peggy Pryde, Paul Cinquevalli, Little Tich, Ada Baker, and many others of great talent which he paid well.

Personal life, death and legacy
Rickards, suffered diabetes and died from apoplexy in Croydon, England, on 13 October 1911, and his body was returned to Australia to be buried in Waverley Cemetery, Sydney. He was married twice and left a widow, Kate Rickards, a trapeze artist, acrobat and performer, and two daughters.
His younger daughter Madge Rickards married the singer and actor Frank Harwood in July 1909.
He was an excellent singer of such cockney songs as "Wot Cher! Knocked 'em in the Old Kent Road" and "His Lordship Winked at the Counsel", and was a first-rate businessman whose hobby was his work. For around 25 years his name was a household word in Australia, and at the time of his death his business as a single-handed manager and proprietor was one of the largest in the world. His theatrical interests were acquired by entrepreneur Hugh D. McIntosh.

References

1843 births
1911 deaths
Australian male comedians
English male comedians
Burials at Waverley Cemetery
People from Stratford, London
English emigrants to Australia